The keynote address at the 2004 Democratic National Convention (DNC) was given by the Illinois State Senator, United States senatorial candidate, and future President Barack Obama on the night of Tuesday, July 27, 2004, in Boston, Massachusetts. His unexpected landslide victory in the March 2004 Illinois U.S. Senate Democratic primary made him a rising star within the national Democratic Party overnight, and led to the reissue of his memoir, Dreams from My Father. His keynote address was well received, which further elevated his status within the Democratic Party and led to his reissued memoir becoming a bestseller.

Obama first met Democratic presidential candidate John Kerry in the spring of 2004, and was one of several names considered for the role of keynote speaker at the party's convention that summer. Obama was told in early July 2004 that he was chosen to deliver the address, and he largely wrote the speech himself, with later edits from the Kerry presidential campaign. Delivered on the second night of the DNC in just under 20 minutes, the address included a biographical sketch of Obama, his own vision of America, and the reasons for his support of Kerry for the presidency. Unlike almost all prior and all subsequent convention keynote addresses, it was not televised by the commercial broadcast networks, and was only seen by a combined PBS, cable news and C-SPAN television audience of about nine million. Since its delivery, several academics have studied the speech, both for the various narratives it describes as well as its implications for racial reconciliation.

Background
In 1996, Obama was first elected to the Illinois Senate by that state's 13th District, and he would go on to hold that seat for eight years. While still a sitting state senator he entered the 2004 Illinois Senate race, which would end on the same day as the 2004 presidential election. The Democratic presidential primary in Illinois was held that March 16, and later that spring Obama had his first opportunity to meet the soon to be nominated Democratic presidential candidate John Kerry, doing two joint Chicago campaign stops that left Kerry impressed.

That April, Kerry campaign manager Mary Beth Cahill began listing possible candidates to be the 2004 Democratic National Convention's keynote speaker—including Jennifer Granholm, Janet Napolitano, Tom Vilsack, Mark Warner, and Bill Richardson—searching for speakers who would generate a significant buzz in the media.  Others involved in the process included convention manager Jack Corrigan and Kerry media advisor Robert Shrum.  Corrigan's friend, Lisa Hay, knew Obama from their time together working on the Harvard Law Review and strongly recommended him. Cahill had previously seen Obama in a photo in TIME and began asking for opinions from people who knew and had worked with him.  Although there were some internal worries about his style of speaking, lack of experience with a teleprompter, opposition to the Iraq War that Kerry initially supported, and the fact that he was only a state senator, they eventually chose Obama over the other finalist, Jennifer Granholm, in part because polls showed Kerry with less support among African-Americans than Democrats normally enjoyed and because he was running for an important Senate seat.  During the process, the Obama senate campaign provided the Kerry camp with an eight-minute audition video, and several Obama advisors lobbied on his behalf with members of the Kerry staff.

According to Obama, he was told just several weeks after his campaigning with Kerry that he would be given some kind of speaking role at that summer's convention; he was later called by Cahill, reportedly sometime right before the Independence Day holiday, who told him that he was chosen to be the convention's keynote speaker.  Kerry first publicly hinted that Obama would deliver the convention's keynote address on June 29, though it was not until July 14 when the official announcement was made.

Writing

Obama began drafting his speech while staying in a hotel in Springfield, Illinois, several days after learning he would deliver the address.  According to his account of that day in The Audacity of Hope, Obama states that he began by considering his own campaign themes and those specific issues he wished to address, and while pondering the various people he had met and stories he had heard during his campaign, was reminded of the phrase "The audacity of hope", which was previously used in a sermon by his pastor Jeremiah Wright. The title of Wright's sermon was "The Audacity to Hope" but Obama recalled it as "The Audacity of Hope", which became the title for his conference address, and later the title of his second book. This seemingly minor change turned Wright's verb into Obama's noun.

Wright had attended a lecture by Dr Frederick G. Sampson in Richmond, Virginia, in the late 1980s, on the George Frederic Watts painting Hope, which inspired him to give a sermon in 1990 based on the subject of the painting - "with her clothes in rags, her body scarred and bruised and bleeding, her harp all but destroyed and with only one string left, she had the audacity to make music and praise God ... To take the one string you have left and to have the audacity to hope ...  that's the real word God will have us hear from this passage and from Watt's painting."

The first draft was written longhand, and Obama reportedly labored over it for some two weeks, often beyond midnight.  Described by his campaign political director as "a greatest hits collection of rhetoric drawn from his stump speeches", Obama also watched and read previous keynote addresses during the process.  Originally given 8 minutes to speak, Obama's completed address ran 25 minutes, leading to two more weeks of edits with advisors that brought it down to 17 minutes.  The final draft was sent to a Democratic speechwriting team at the FleetCenter on roughly July 20, at which time some biographical material was removed so as to include more on the presidential ticket; one report indicated that roughly three quarters was reported to have been left intact after the Kerry campaign's edits, while another indicated that very little had been changed.  After delivering it, Obama acknowledged that his and Kerry's staffs had reviewed the speech for length, noting, however, that he was proud to have written it himself along with most of his other speeches.

Convention
The 2004 Democratic National Convention (DNC), held at the FleetCenter (now the TD Garden) in Boston, Massachusetts, began on July 26, with Obama scheduled to address the delegates the following evening.  The Obama campaign was unhappy with the time slot and hoped to change it, as that night would not be covered by the major networks.

Obama arrived in Boston at 1:30 am EDT Sunday the 25th on a chartered Hawker jet, delayed in Illinois because of a hold up on the state budget.  The aircraft was provided for him because that same morning Obama made his first appearance on Meet the Press, hosted by Tim Russert.  During the interview, Obama touched upon what he hoped to achieve in the speech:

This was followed by appearances on Face the Nation and Late Edition.

Obama appeared on Good Morning America the day of the speech, and when asked how he would deal with the fact that he was against the invasion of Iraq while Kerry and Edwards supported the resolution approving the use of military force, responded that they were focused on the future instead of looking back at the past, and that now everyone was interested in seeing a successful policy on the war.  Obama also stated the advice his wife Michelle had given him for the night's address: "Don't screw it up."

During another interview that morning with NPR, Obama said, "I'm sure I'm going to be excited, although I was here last night and something that really takes the pressure off, you realize that nobody's listening... So, you know, who knows what lines I could slip in there...No one would notice. So as long as I'm smiling and waving, I think I'll be OK." He referred to talk about his presidential prospects as silly, and also addressed the risk of being typecast, as another young African-American politician, Harold Ford, had given the keynote address in 2000. That afternoon he was at Boston Harbor where he gave a speech on environmental policy to a small crowd.

According to Martin Nesbitt, a close friend of Obama, the two were walking together the afternoon before the speech, and when Nesbitt likened him to a rock star because of the crowd growing behind them, Obama replied: "Yeah, if you think it’s bad today, wait until tomorrow... My speech is pretty good."

Speech

Preparation
Obama was scheduled to give his keynote address on the night of Tuesday, July 27.  Some Obama advisors were concerned prior to his delivery, because it amounted to the first time he used a teleprompter.  He would have three one-hour practice sessions in what were normally the FleetCenter locker rooms of the Boston Bruins and the Boston Celtics, reportedly having difficulty with the teleprompter while also learning various techniques in speaking to a live and TV audience.  Once while Obama was backstage rehearsing his speech, he met Kerry staffer and speechwriter Jon Favreau (later to become Obama's speechwriter), who instructed him that to avoid overlap with Kerry, a sentence had to be changed. The sentence involved, later recalled as "We're not red states and blue states; we're all Americans, standing up together for the red, white, and blue" was to conclude his paragraph on red states and blue states, but was instead used by Kerry as "Maybe some just see us divided into those red states and blue states, but I see us as one America: red, white, and blue"; it is unclear whether or not this already existed in Kerry's speech, but regardless, its removal left Obama incensed.

Delivery
Stepping on stage shortly before 9:45 pm EDT to the 1964 song "Keep On Pushing" by The Impressions, Obama would go on to speak for 17 minutes, interrupted 33 times by the audience's applause. The final speech would amount to 2,297 words.

After thanking Illinois Senator Dick Durbin for the introduction and acknowledging the privilege of speaking there, Obama immediately launched into a brief auto-biographical sketch, from his Kenyan grandfather's work as a domestic servant for the British, to his own father who obtained a scholarship to come to the United States.  He then spoke of his mother's family, describing his grandfather fighting under Patton in World War II while his grandmother worked on a bomber assembly line and raised his mother.  Obama explained that the African name given to him by his parents, Barack, meant "blessed", concluding that:
 He went on to mention several Americans he had met who were struggling with jobs, healthcare, and education, stating that "they don't expect government to solve all their problems...But they sense, deep in their bones, that with just a slight change in priorities, we can make sure that every child in America has a decent shot at life, and that the doors of opportunity remain open to all."

In the next segment of his address, Obama mentioned John Kerry for the first time, enumerating his major values and beliefs on a host of issues, interrupted by a story of a young Marine he had met and the affirmation that when military action is undertaken, the families and soldiers involved must be cared for and that there is an obligation to "never ever go to war without enough troops to win the war, secure the peace, and earn the respect of the world."  Obama subsequently returned to Kerry and affirmed his commitment to keep America secure.

Obama then addressed the ideas of community and unity in America, that a person struggling somewhere affects us even if we are not directly involved.  Referring to the "spin masters" and "negative ad peddlers" who he claimed were ready to divide the country, Obama declared:

Asking whether the country wished to engage in a politics of cynicism or hope, he stated that Kerry and Edwards called on the American people to hope, which he assured was not simply "blind optimism".

Stating his own beliefs on what could be done, Obama said that he believed "we have a righteous wind at our backs" and expressed confidence in the country's ability to meet the current challenges.  He concluded by expressing his belief that in November Kerry and Edwards would be elected, and with their inauguration, "this country will reclaim its promise, and out of this long political darkness, a brighter day will come."

Reception

Family
After the speech Obama and his wife were interviewed by Brian Williams, and when asked about what she thought, Michelle replied, "And all I have to say is, honey, you didn't screw it up, so good job." Obama said that he hoped his two daughters had watched the whole event, as their baby-sitter was permitted to let them stay up only if they watched the convention. Obama's grandmother, Madelyn Dunham, called Obama after the speech and told him, "You did well...I just kind of worry about you. I hope you keep your head on straight."  She was later quoted by a journalist: "I was a little amazed. It was really quite an exceptional speech, or I'm being prejudiced, I don't know. But, to me, it was really quite exceptional."

News media and pundits
Immediately after the speech MSNBC host Chris Matthews admitted, "I have to tell you, a little chill in my legs right now. That is an amazing moment in history right there. It is surely an amazing moment. A keynoter like I have never heard." He added later in the night, "...I have seen the first black president there. And the reason I say that is because I think the immigrant experience combined with the African background, combined with the incredible education, combined with his beautiful speech, not every politician gets help with the speech, but that speech was a piece of work."  Commenting the next day, Pat Buchanan, while complimentary towards Obama, was more critical of what he called a centrist speech: "He is hiding what he truly believes. What does Obama believe about this war?"  On PBS, columnist David Brooks responded positively, "This is why you go to conventions, to watch a speech like this," while Mark Shields said, "A star is born."

Former Jimmy Carter speechwriter Hendrik Hertzberg considered it slightly better than Mario Cuomo's 1984 keynote address, stating, "If he wrote that speech, then he should be president, because it's such a great speech. If he didn't, he should be president because he found such a great speechwriter." Martin Medhurst, a professor of rhetoric and communications at Baylor University, disagreed about it being better than Cuomo's, even if it was an exceptional performance. Stressing that it was too early to make any predictions, he noted that new political stars were not normally created because of keynote addresses.

Tom Brokaw asked rhetorically whether Obama or Kerry would be the man more remembered from the convention, while CNN's Jeff Greenfield called it "one of the really great keynote speeches of the last quarter-century." Howard Fineman noted that Obama's emphasis on parents, not government in teaching children was the same kind of language that could have been heard amongst Republicans. Rice University historian Douglas Brinkley stated, "Obama trumped Bill Clinton. Clinton gave a good speech yesterday. Obama was better. That's hard to do in American politics."

Newspapers
The day after the speech, a Chicago Tribune editorial declared Obama "The Phenom". The Washington Times acknowledged that it would likely disagree with Obama's policies, but compared with John Edwards' speech, "his sentiments had a freshness and a realness that Mr. Edwards' lacked."  A reporter for Britain's The Independent declared that the mantle of who was most likely to be the first black president had passed from Colin Powell to Obama, though another was left unimpressed, finding the speech "disappointingly free of original thought".  Kenya's The Nation also covered the speech, and noted his use of biography, particularly his Kenyan heritage.  A columnist for The Christian Science Monitor acknowledged that many aspects of his speech were typical of political speeches, but that Obama had managed to make it appear as though they were something new and exciting.  Speaking of the broadcast networks that had not covered the address, the column said, "They missed the national debut of what could be one of the most exciting and important voices in American politics in the next half century."

Politicians
Obama's fellow Illinois Democrats praised him after the speech.  Illinois Speaker of the House Michael Madigan reacted by saying, "He is a star...For Barack, the sky's the limit," while Chicago Mayor Richard M. Daley said, "He hit a grand slam home run." Senate President Emil Jones responded, "It was such a moving speech that I had tears in my eyes...It was electrifying. When I looked around the room, all across the people were so emotional, tears in their eyes. They're crying. A great individual, a great Illinoisan."  Governor Rod Blagojevich stated, "After the speech last night, I would think that even if he had an opponent, he might get 100 percent of the vote." Former Illinois Senator Carol Moseley Braun said, "Obama represents the best of what we brought from our generation...he represents a kind of division within the Democratic Party. It's not the old left."

New York Senator Hillary Clinton, who would later run against Obama for the Democratic nomination in 2008 and go on to serve as his Secretary of State during his first term as U.S. President, was quoted saying, "I thought that was one of the most electrifying moments that I can remember at any convention." Alabama Representative Artur Davis pushed the idea of Obama running for president, stating, "If anyone can do it, Obama can...Obama may help break down the stereotypes that an African-American politician is someone only for other blacks...When Obama runs for the White House, he will run not as a candidate for blacks. He has the capacity to run as a candidate for everyone."

Academics
In an article entitled "An Immigrant's Dream and the Audacity of Hope" in the American Behavioral Scientist, Babak Elahi and Grant Cos compare Obama's speech to the one given by California Governor Arnold Schwarzenegger at the 2004 Republican National Convention, both utilizing an "immigrant dream narrative".  They observe that in Obama's rhetorical shift away from his own biography and back toward that of John Kerry, he was able to make a convincing argument that Senator Kerry, through his own service to the country, was an "honorary immigrant", and thus that Kerry too had chosen to be an American citizen.

In "Recasting the American Dream and American Politics", Robert C. Rowland and John M. Jones, two professors of communications, argue that the disconnect between what policies the majority of the American public reported supporting (more liberal) and the political label the plurality used to describe themselves as (conservative) had to do with the fact that America's romantic narrative, the search for the American Dream, had become closely associated with Ronald Reagan and conservatives, and that in a keynote address unremarkable in its basic themes, Obama sought to recast the narrative as one associated with liberals.  Whereas Reagan's narrative focused heavily on individualism, Obama used the metaphor of hope to call for a balance between those individual values and community values, the latter also being necessary for the achievement of the American Dream.

David A. Frank at the University of Oregon compares Obama's speech with the one given by Al Sharpton at the same convention, stating that while Sharpton did not stray beyond familiar themes of African American trauma, Obama broadened his scope to include all races and classes in a narrative that "harkened back to the Roosevelt-Johnson legacy of shared purpose and coalition..."  In an alternative reading, Mark Lawrence McPhail criticizes Obama, stating that his "reduction of black trauma to 'slaves sitting around a fire singing freedom songs'" romanticizes the historical realities of black suffering and borders on the stereotypical image of the "'happy darkie' of traditional racism", and that his speech did not contribute to an open conversation about racism that is ultimately necessary for racial reconciliation.

Audience
Roughly 9.1 million people were reported to have watched the Democratic convention on the night of the speech, ratings which were described as "tepid" by Variety, as it only amounted to "about half the audience tuning into regularly scheduled summer programming the week before", and was less than the 10.3 million people who tuned into the second night of the 2000 DNC.  However, neither ABC, CBS, nor NBC provided any coverage of the convention that night (some Chicago affiliates did broadcast Obama's speech), leading to criticism from some columnists.  But with major networks not covering the evening's events, other stations received greater viewership, including 3 million viewers for PBS, followed by CNN, Fox News, and MSNBC.

Aftermath
That night Fox News reported that people had been taking the Obama signs from the convention floor as keepsakes, whereas many signs for Teresa Heinz-Kerry were still on the floor.

In an interview with JET, Obama acknowledged that the speech had exceeded peoples' expectations and that he felt encouraged by the fact that many people appeared to respond to the themes of common values and working together. When asked about all the presidential speculation, Obama responded, "I just need to win the Senate right now."

After easily defeating Alan Keyes to win his Senate seat and being sworn into office on January 4, 2005, Obama wrote The Audacity of Hope, which was released in October 2006. Despite initially saying that he had no immediate plans to run for president and would serve out his full Senate term, Obama would go on to run for and be elected the 44th President of the United States on November 4, 2008, defeating John McCain and becoming the first African American to be elected to the nation's highest office. On November 6, 2012, Obama was reelected to a second term as President of the United States, defeating former Massachusetts governor Mitt Romney. His presidency has been consistently praised by the general public in surveys and by presidential historians in presidential greatness rankings.

Obama nominated John Kerry to serve as his Secretary of State during the former's second term, as Hillary Clinton declined to stay on; Kerry was subsequently confirmed and served as Secretary of State until the conclusion of Obama's presidency in January 2017.

Ten years after the speech, The Washington Post noted its historic nature and everything that followed from it: "Then the next ten years happened."

References

 
Note: All transcripts listed below without links were accessed by LexisNexis Academic.

External links

 Video of entire speech from C-SPAN
 Prepared remarks versus Transcript of speech

Speeches by Barack Obama
Keynote Address, 2004 Democratic National Convention
Democratic National Convention keynote address